Walckenaerianus is a genus of sheet weavers that was first described by J. Wunderlich in 1995.

Species
 it contains only two species:
Walckenaerianus aimakensis Wunderlich, 1995 – Russia, Mongolia
Walckenaerianus esyunini Tanasevitch, 2004 – Bulgaria, Russia, Kazakhstan

See also
 List of Linyphiidae species (Q–Z)

References

Araneomorphae genera
Linyphiidae
Spiders of Asia